Pedregulho is a municipality in the state of São Paulo, Brazil. The population is 16,811 (2020 est.) in an area of 713 km2.

The municipality contains the  Furnas do Bom Jesus State Park, created in 1989.

References

Municipalities in São Paulo (state)